Bryan Joseph McEntegart (January 5, 1893 – September 30, 1968) was an American prelate of the Roman Catholic Church. He served as bishop of the Diocese of Ogdensburg in Northern New York (1943–1953), rector of the Catholic University of America in Washington, D.C. (1953–1957), and as bishop of the Diocese of Brooklyn in New York City (1957–1968).

Biography

Early life and education
Bryan McEntegart was born on January 5, 1893, in Brooklyn to Patrick and Katherine (née Roe) McEntegart. He studied at Manhattan College in New York City, obtaining a Bachelor of Arts degree in 1913.  McEntegart then entered  St. Joseph's Seminary in Yonkers, New York.

Ordination and ministry
McEntegart was ordained to the priesthood for the Archdiocese of New York by Cardinal John Farley on September 8, 1917. In 1918, he earned a Master's degree from Catholic University of America with a thesis entitled: "The Care of the Poor in New York in the 17th Century." McEntegart then served as a curate at Sacred Heart Parish in New York City until 1923, when he was transferred to St. Patrick's Cathedral.

After pursuing his graduate studies at the New York School of Social Work (1919-1920), McEntegart was named the first director of the Children's Division in the Catholic Charities of the Archdiocese of New York. During his tenure as director, he also taught courses in child welfare at Fordham Graduate School of Social Service (1920-1930), served on the White House Committee on Child Welfare under Presidents Herbert Hoover and Franklin D. Roosevelt, and was director of the Child Welfare League of America (1931-1937). McEntegart was a curate at St. Frances de Sales Parish in Manhattan from 1938 to 1941. In 1941, he was elected president of the National Conference of Catholic Charities. From 1941 to 1943, McEntegart served as national secretary of the Catholic Near East Welfare Association. He became the first executive director of Catholic Relief Services in 1943. He also served on the board of the United Service Organizations for fourteen years.

Bishop of Ogdensburg
On June 5, 1943, McEntegart was appointed the fifth Bishop of the Diocese of Ogdensburg by Pope Pius XII. He received his episcopal consecration on August 3, 1943, from Archbishop Amleto Cicognani, with Bishops Edmund Gibbons and Stephen Joseph Donahue serving as co-consecrators, at St. Patrick's Cathedral. Shortly after his installation, the Cathedral of Ogdensburg was destroyed by fire; however, McEntegart constructed a new edifice within months.

Rector of Catholic University 
From 1953 to 1957, McEntegart served as rector of the Catholic University of America. He was assigned the titular see of Aradi on August 19, 1953. During his administration, he embarked on a large fund-raising campaign to expand all phases of the university's work.

Bishop of Brooklyn
Pope Pius XII appointed McEntegart as the fourth bishop of the Diocese of Brooklyn on April 16, 1957, the largest diocese in the United States in terms of Catholic population. He was installed by Cardinal Francis Spellman on June 13, 1957. During his tenure he launched a multimillion-dollar building program, which included six high schools, Cathedral Preparatory Seminary in Queens, New York, a hospital, a college for training Long Island's priests, and a four-year theological seminary. He promoted outreach to the growing Hispanic population, sending priests and religious to study Spanish language and culture. He attended all four sessions of the Second Vatican Council between 1962 and 1965; he implemented the reforms of the council, becoming a pioneer in the ecumenical movement and establishing the Pastoral Institute in 1967. He was given the personal title of archbishop by Pope Paul VI on April 15, 1966.

Retirement
In early 1968, McEntegart tendered his resignation as Bishop of the Diocese Brooklyn because of poor health, and Pope Paul VI accepted it on July 17, 1968. Two months later, after suffering a stroke, Bryan McEntegart died at his residence in the Fort Greene section of Brooklyn at age 75.

References

1893 births
1968 deaths
20th-century Roman Catholic bishops in the United States
Columbia University School of Social Work alumni
Fordham University faculty
Manhattan College alumni
Participants in the Second Vatican Council
Roman Catholic bishops of Ogdensburg
Roman Catholic bishops of Brooklyn
Saint Joseph's Seminary (Dunwoodie) alumni
Catholic University of America alumni
Catholic University of America faculty
Religious leaders from New York (state)
Presidents of the Catholic University of America
People from Fort Greene, Brooklyn
American Roman Catholic clergy of Irish descent
20th-century American academics